The index of MS-DOS compatible video games is split into multiple pages because of its size.

To navigate by individual letter use the table of contents below.

This list contains  games.

Notes

Indexes of video game topics
Lists of PC games